The Voice UK is a British television music competition to find new singing talent. The first series began on 24 March 2012 and ended on 2 June 2012. The show was co-presented by Holly Willoughby and Reggie Yates on BBC One. The series was won by Leanne Mitchell, who was on Tom Jones' team. However, the most successful artist to come from this series, and arguably the entire version of the U.K. show, was Becky Hill who was able to reach number one in the UK Singles Chart as a feature on the hit song,  Gecko (Overdive) alongside Dutch DJ Oliver Heldens. Hill, who was on Jessie J’s team, was eliminated in the Live Show rounds of the competition.

Coaches

Huge speculation began when the BBC announced that there would be four coaches on the panel of The Voice. It was said that Kylie Minogue was due to become a coach on the show, but it would have cost the TV station too much to get her on the panel. Her sister, Dannii Minogue was also confirmed to be in the running after she left the panel of The X Factor. Mark Owen and Lenny Kravitz were strong candidates for the role. Frankie Sandford of The Saturdays was also confirmed to be in the running. The show's producers were impressed with Cee Lo Green's performance on the U. S. version and wanted him on the UK version, but he turned the chance down. Dannii Minogue's former work mate, Cheryl Cole was also said to be a candidate. However, Cole and Minogue were both ruled out after producers said they wanted to "start fresh" and not have The X Factor left overs. However, though Cole and Minogue were ruled out the BBC were keen to show enthusiasm about Charlotte Church, Robbie Williams and Jessie J was also announced to be in with a chance. Tom Jones was offered a role, and later accepted the offer. It was revealed that Frankie Sandford was on the verge of signing a contract to become a coach. George Michael and Mary J. Blige were also being considered, with Blige saying on Alan Carr: Chatty Man she has had meetings about her future on the show, she spoke "I have been approached and we have been in discussions about The Voice. I'm not sure if I'm doing it right now. We'll have to wait and see. " will.i.am was confirmed to be close to signing a contract with the show's producers. It was said that Frankie Sandford was awaiting to finalise her contract, but she pulled out because of her "busy schedule".

Controversy arose after Danny O'Donoghue was announced as a coach, being picked over Will Young. Young put on his Twitter account, "The Voice came, the Voice went. They wanted to go more rock... Should have dusted off my Leather jacket! Hey ho, (sic)" he said, before adding: "Hang on... Just got Jimmy Page on the line. I'm commiserating him." A tweet the previous night may have also been connected to the loss of role saying, "Words escape me. Life is sometimes a bitch".

Former The X Factor contestants Shayne Ward and Stacey Solomon were both in the running to be hosts. The One Show presenter Alex Jones was also a possibility. Despite Dermot O'Leary signing a three year contract with The X Factor, The Voice producers are eager to have him present the show. It was also said that Emile Heskey was in the running. However, former, The Xtra Factor and This Morning host, Holly Willoughby was confirmed to be a candidate after she left as the host on Dancing on Ice. It was later confirmed that Willoughby and BBC Radio presenter, Reggie Yates would be the presenters.

Teams 
Key

Blind auditions
The blind auditions began in London on 18 January 2012 at the BBC Television Centre and finished filming on 22 January 2012. Each coach has the length of the artists' performance to decide if they want that artist on their team. Should two or more coaches want the same artist, then the artist gets to choose their coach. Once the coaches have picked their team, they are to pit them against each other in the ultimate sing off; the battles.

Episode 1 (24 March)
The first blind audition episode was broadcast on 24 March 2012.

Group performance: The Voice UK Coaches – "I Gotta Feeling"

Episode 2 (31 March)
The second blind audition episode was broadcast on 31 March 2012.

Episode 3 (7 April)
The third blind audition episode was broadcast on 7 April 2012.

Episode 4 (14 April)
The fourth and final blind audition episode was broadcast on 14 April 2012.

Notes

  The artist Jaz Ellington was requested, by coach Jessie J, to sing a second track; despite having already joined coach will.i.am's team. Ellington selected "Ordinary People" by John Legend, having already performed "The A Team" by Ed Sheeran.

Battle rounds
The recording of the battle rounds took place on 22 and 23 February 2012 at The Fountain Studios in Wembley with five artists from each team progressing to the live shows. Each coach pitted two of their ten artists together as they performed a song of the coach's choice at the same time in a boxing ring-styled stage. After the two artists completed the song, one progressed to the live shows and one was eliminated from the competition. Once the coaches had completed this process, they each had five artists for the live shows.

The battle advisors for these episodes were: Paloma Faith working with Danny O'Donoghue, Cerys Matthews of Catatonia working with Tom Jones, Ana Matronic of Scissor Sisters working with Jessie J, and Dante Santiago working with will.i.am.

The battle round episodes aired on the 21 and 22 April 2012, in a special "battles weekend" (as the blind auditions were only shown on Saturdays).

Colour key

Live shows 
The live performance shows are aired live from Elstree Studios and will run for six consecutive weeks, ending on 2 June 2012. The first results show on 29 April featured a performance from American singer-songwriter Lana Del Rey with British singer-songwriter Emeli Sandé performing during the second results show on 6 May 2012. American group Scissor Sisters performed during the third result show on 13 May 2012 with The Voice UK Battle Round Adviser Paloma Faith performing during the fourth results show on 20 May 2012. Cheryl and Kylie Minogue performed during the fifth live show It was confirmed on 18 May 2012 that the final on 2 June 2012 would feature performances from Ed Sheeran and Maroon 5.

Results summary
Team’s Colour Key 
 Team Will
 Team Jessie
 Team Tom 
 Team Danny

Result's colour key

Live show details

Week 1 (28 & 29 April) 
The first live show aired on 28 April 2012 – with Team Tom and Team will.i.am performing.

Group performance(s): The Voice UK Coaches – "Beautiful Day"; Team Jessie and Team Danny – "You Get What You Give" / "Don't Stop the Music"
 Musical guest: Lana Del Rey ("Blue Jeans")

Week 2 (5 & 6 May) 
The second live show aired on 5 May 2012 – with Team Jessie and Team Danny performing.

Group performance(s): Team will.i.am – "Higher"; Team Tom – "Higher Ground"
 Musical guest: Emeli Sandé ("My Kind of Love")

Week 3 (12 & 13 May) 
The third live show aired on Saturday 12 May 2012 – with Team Tom and Team will.i.am performing. Both judges had to eliminate two of their artists, leaving them with two each for the semi-final shows.

Group performance(s): Team Tom with Tom Jones – "Hit the Road Jack"; Team will.i.am with will.i.am – "Gold Digger" / "Just Can't Get Enough"; Team Jessie – "Canned Heat"; Team Danny – "Starlight"
Musical guest: Scissor Sisters ("Only the Horses")

Week 4 (19 & 20 May) 
The fourth live show was on Saturday 19 May 2012 – with Team Danny and Team Jessie performing. Both judges had to eliminate two of their artists, leaving them with two each for the semi-final shows.

Group performance(s): Team Jessie with Jessie J – "We Are Young"; Team Danny with Danny O'Donoghue – "Somebody That I Used To Know"; Team Tom – "Shake It Out"; Team will.i.am – "Roxanne"
Musical guest: Paloma Faith ("Picking Up the Pieces")

Week 5: Semi-final (26 & 27 May)
The fifth live show aired on 26 May 2012, with all teams performing. The public then chose one artist from each team to advance to the final. For the first time in the series, Cheryl's performance was live on Saturday's show, but Kylie's performance was broadcast on Sunday's results show. It was also the first time there were two special musical guests.

Group performance(s): The Voice UK Final 8 – "You're the Voice"
Musical guests: Cheryl ("Call My Name"), Kylie Minogue ("Timebomb")

Week 6: Final (2 June)
The final live show aired on 2 June 2012. Each coach had one artist each in their team, and for the first time in the series, each artist performed three songs: a solo number, a duet with their coach and their favourite song of the series.

 Group performance(s): The Voice UK Coaches – Medley of "It's Not Unusual" / "Breakeven" / "Price Tag" / "Where Is the Love?"
Musical guests: Ed Sheeran ("Small Bump"), Maroon 5 ("Payphone", "Moves Like Jagger")

Reception

Ratings

Controversies
BBC Radio 2's Paul Gambaccini told the Radio Times that The Voice UK is "karaoke", and Mark Goodier questioned the motives of Universal Music saying, "Universal have to be doing this because they want market share." On whether The Voice is to become a "huge hit" in the UK, he added, "It really depends on whether they find a star or not."

During her performance in the fourth live show, Becky Hill forgot her words and said an explicit word. Willoughby apologized after the performance. An edited version to the performance was posted on BBC iPlayer and YouTube.

See also

References

External links 
 

Series 01
2012 British television seasons